Chamaemyia nigripalpis is a species of fly in the family Chamaemyiidae. It is found in the Great Britain. The type series was collected from a patch of Calamagrostis epigejos where it was repeatedly observed through May to August.

References

Chamaemyiidae
Muscomorph flies of Europe
Endemic fauna of the United Kingdom
Insects described in 1966
Taxa named by James Edward Collin